Paukka is a small village in the southeast of the Sagaing Division in Burma.  It is located east by road from Tizaung and the township seat of Sagaing. The village of Legyi lies to the east.

Populated places in Sagaing District